Zilanlı (also, Zilanly) is a village in the Qubadli Rayon of Azerbaijan.

References 

Populated places in Qubadli District